Maker's Row is an online marketplace launched in November 2012 that connects American manufacturers with small, medium-sized, and product-based businesses. The site lists more than 1,400 manufacturers.

History 
Maker's Row was co-founded by Matthew Burnett, Tanya Menendez and Scott Weiner. Burnett, an industrial designer, previously owned and operated a watch line and a fashion line of leather goods. In early 2011, Burnett partnered with Tanya Menendez, then a Goldman Sachs analyst, to manage sales and operations at the fashion line. While working on the fashion line, Menendez came up with the idea to create a resource that would bring factories in the United States online in one place to make American factories more accessible.  In May 2012, the  Burnett and Menendez applied to The Brooklyn Beta Summer Camp where they would meet Scott Weiner, who was chosen to be the founding technical lead for the group.

On July 19, 2013 Maker's Row announced 1 million in seed funding.

City series 
In summer 2013, Maker's Row launched Maker’s Row City Series to highlight how manufacturing contributes to the local community, economy, and city. The first and only city in the series is Newark, NJ. In collaboration with the Office of Mayor Cory Booker, Brick City Development Corporation, and Newark Regional Business Partnership, Maker's Row created a video celebrating Newark manufacturers.

Services

Maker's Row Pros 
Maker's Row Pros is a service that offers personal guidance in manufacturing and other areas. The members that have joined the “Maker Community” are able to communicate one-on-one with professionals through the service.

References 

Manufacturing in the United States
Online marketplaces of the United States